Ricardo da Cruz Cerqueira, usually known as Ricardo Cruz (born May 19, 1962 in Rio de Janeiro), is a Brazilian football manager and former goalkeeper.

Coaching career
Ricardo Cruz began his brilliant career as goalkeeper on playground of pottery, being revealed by began his brilliant career as goalkeeper on of pottery is Olaria being revealed by the Fluminense. There won some titles in the reserve, with boy still. was hired by the Botafogo gaining the 1989 and 1990, after fasting 20 years without win titles. He remained in the Botafogo until the end of the 1992 Campeonato Brasileiro Série A in which the final was disputed against the Flamengo. Then, still as professional player acted by Ponte Preta returned to the Fluminense, America and ending his career also in pottery, around 1995. became coach of goalkeepers, starting also in the categories of the base of the Fluminense, gaining many titles since mirim until juniors, reaching the professional where was not very time.

Soon after it has forwarded to the foundations of the Brazilian selection, working together with the technician Nelson Rodriguez 2002 until 2007, Ali managed many titles since U-17 and U-20. In July 2007 received a proposal to work in the Arab world, as trainer of goalkeepers of Al Nasr U-18 in Dubai, United Arab Emirates and in the years of 2014 and 2015, worked in this same function in America, was invited to be coach after the resignation of unexpected Arturzinho and immediately at the beginning of the career of technical, rising the club after five years the First Division of the Campeonato Carioca and consequentemente the title in the Série B and after being consummated as coach.

Honours

Player 
 Botafogo
 Campeonato Carioca: 1989, 1990

Manager 
 America
 Campeonato Carioca Série B: 2015

References

1962 births
Living people
Footballers from Rio de Janeiro (city)
Brazilian footballers
Brazilian football managers
Association football goalkeepers
Campeonato Brasileiro Série A managers
Campeonato Brasileiro Série C players
Fluminense FC managers
Botafogo de Futebol e Regatas managers
Associação Atlética Ponte Preta players
America Football Club (RJ) players
Olaria Atlético Clube players
America Football Club (RJ) managers